North Buck Shoals Township is one of twelve townships in Yadkin County, North Carolina, United States. The township had a population of 2,330 according to the 2000 census.

Geographically, North Buck Shoals Township occupies  in western Yadkin County.  North Buck Shoals Township's western border is with Wilkes County.

Townships in Yadkin County, North Carolina
Townships in North Carolina